Olivia "Chachi" Hildén (née Gonzales) is an American dancer, choreographer and actress. She was a member of the dance crew I.aM.mE, which won the sixth season of America's Best Dance Crew in 2011.

Life and career
Hildén was born Olivia Gonzales in Houston, Texas. At the age of 6, Gonzales enrolled at a local dance studio and was trained as a ballet dancer. Three years later at a dance event she attended, Gonzales witnessed a hip hop dance crew for the first time. One of the crews there was Marvelous Motion, whose members (Phillip Chbeeb, Di Zhang and Brandon Harrell) would later become her fellow crew members in I.aM.mE. Gonzales became immediately intrigued and decided to participate in hip hop from then on. She enrolled at Lanier Middle School where hip hop was one of the dance styles taught. Shortly after, her mother located the Marvelous Motion Studios and enrolled her in a few classes.

In 2010, after the disbandment of Marvelous Motion, its three members Phillip "Pacman" Chbeeb, Di "Moon" Zhang and Brandon "747" Harrell held an audition to create a new crew, I.aM.mE. Added to the lineup were the three new members: Olivia "Chachi" Gonzales, Emilio "Millie" Dosal, and Jana "Jaja" Vaňková in preparation for America's Best Dance Crew: Season of the Superstars. Gonzales was the youngest member of I.aM.mE.

Awards and appearances
Gonzales was one of the backup dancers for the Tribute to Britney Spears as part of the 2011 MTV Video Music Awards.

In 2012, she was named "Teen Choreographer of the Year" at the World of Dance 2012 Industry Awards, and made a dance appearance with I.aM.mE in the Disney TV programme, Shake It Up.

In June 2013, she choreographed the dance to the second theme song of the fashion doll franchise Monster High, in "We Are Monster High".

She took the lead role in the 2014 feature film The Legend of DarkHorse County, directed by Shawn Welling and produced by Welling Films.

Gonzales was one of the cast in the second season of teen drama East Los High which commenced on July 7, 2014.

At the 2014 WorldFest-Houston International Film Festival awards, Gonzales won the Remi Award for Best Supporting Actress for The Legend of DarkHorse County. In 2015, she won the silver Remi Awards for Original Comedy Short for the 2014 In the News episode "Dog Day" and for the AXI episode "Alive" for Best Dramatic Original Short Film. All of these films were produced by Welling Films of Houston, Texas.

In May 2015, Gonzales visited the Philippines for the second time to judge in the grand finals of the Jagthug World Dance Off competition which was held at the Mall of Asia Arena in Manila on May 30, 2015. Judging alongside her were Misha Gabriel and Andrew Veluz. They also taught two days of dance workshops at SM Megamall.

Personal life
In 2018, Gonzales began dating Finnish stunt performer and actor Jukka Hildén of the Dudesons fame and they got engaged in August 2018. They had met while filming the 2018 television series Ultimate Expedition. On May 29, 2019, they announced publicly via Instagram and YouTube that Gonzales was pregnant. They married on September 28, 2019, in Lapland, Finland. On November 25, 2019, Gonzales gave birth to a baby girl, whom the couple named Sophia Rose. In April 2020, they moved from Los Angeles to Ähtäri, Finland, and later in 2020, they relocated to Helsinki, Finland. On January 23, 2021, Gonzales announced via her Instagram page that she was several months pregnant with her second child. On July 20, 2021, Gonzalez welcomed her second child, Amélie Irene.

Filmography

References

External links

 
 
 
 
 

1996 births
Living people
America's Best Dance Crew contestants
American hip hop dancers
American female dancers
Dancers from Texas
Hispanic and Latino American actresses
Hispanic and Latino American dancers
American choreographers
American television actresses
Actresses from Houston
High School for the Performing and Visual Arts alumni
American expatriates in Finland
21st-century American women